Celestino Cardinal Aós Braco O.F.M.Cap. (born 6 April 1945) is a Spanish-born prelate of the Catholic Church and the Archbishop of Santiago, in Chile.  He was appointed Apostolic Administrator of Santiago by Pope Francis on 23 March 2019, then Archbishop there on 27 December (installed 11 January 2020).

On 25 October 2020, Pope Francis announced he would raise him to the rank of cardinal at a consistory scheduled for 28 November 2020.

Biography
Aós Braco was born in Artaiz (Unciti) in the province of Navarra, Spain, on 6 April 1945. He studied philosophy in Zaragoza and theology in Pamplona. He took his initial vows as a Capuchin on 15 August 1964 at Sangüesa and his final vows on 16 September 1967 in Pamplona. He received his priestly ordination on 30 March 1968. He then fulfilled assignments in Spain as professor in Lecaroz–Navarra and vicar in Tudela. 

He earned his licentiate in psychology at the University of Barcelona in 1980. In 1980-1981, he held a fellowship that allowed him to conduct psychological research at the Pontifical Catholic University of Chile. Returning to Spain he was professor in Pamplona and vicar in Zaragoza. He was transferred to Chile in 1983 where he was appointed parochial vicar in Longaví, diocese of Linares. Two years later, he was elected superior of the Capuchin community in Los Ángeles and subsequently he was transferred to Recreo (Viña del Mar), becoming the episcopal vicar for the consecrated life of the Diocese of Valparaíso. Other responsibilities included economic provincial of the Capuchins in Chile, Promotor of Justice of the ecclesiastical tribunal of Valparaíso, judge of the ecclesiastical tribunal of Concepción, and treasurer of the Chilean association of canon law.

In 2007, while promoter of justice in Valparaiso, he heard but judged "implausible" a complaint of sexual abuse made by a former seminarian against a former rector of the seminary, and the seminarian did not file a formal complaint to press the issue.

Pope Francis named him Bishop of Copiapó on 25 July 2014, and he received his episcopal ordination on 18 October from the apostolic nuncio to Chile, Ivo Scapolo.

On 23 March 2019, Francis gave him the additional position of Apostolic Administrator of Santiago, and Aós took up his responsibilities at a Mass there the next day.

On 18 April 2019, the then Archbishop Aós Braco refused communion to at least two people who knelt to receive it, though norms allow communicants to stand or kneel. A week later he distributed Communion to people kneeling. In mid-May he told an interviewer:

On 27 December 2019, Pope Francis named him Archbishop of Santiago. At Aós Braco's installation as archbishop on 11 January 2020 a small group of protestors lit gas canisters in the cathedral as part of the ongoing protests.

On 25 October 2020, Pope Francis announced he would raise him to the rank of cardinal at a consistory scheduled for 28 November 2020. At that consistory, Pope France made him Cardinal-Priest of Santi Nereo e Achilleo. On 16 December he was named a member of the Pontifical Commission for Latin America.

See also
Cardinals created by Pope Francis

References

External links

 
 Diocese of Copiapó, Nuestro Obispo

 
1945 births
Living people
University of Zaragoza alumni
University of Barcelona alumni
People from Navarre
Capuchin bishops
Capuchin cardinals
Roman Catholic archbishops of Santiago de Chile
21st-century Roman Catholic bishops in Chile
Cardinals created by Pope Francis
Roman Catholic bishops of Copiapó